George Luther Hathaway (August 4, 1813 – July 5, 1872) was a politician in New Brunswick, Canada. His surname also appears as Hatheway.

He was born in Musquash, New Brunswick, the son of Calvin Luther Hatheway and Sarah Harrison.

He entered politics as a reformer and advocate of responsible government. Hathaway was a noted drinker, and often sipped brandy while campaigning. He was elected to the colony's legislative assembly in 1850, and re-elected in 1854 and 1856, but lost his seat in 1857. He returned to the house in 1861, and became chief commissioner of public works.

In 1865, Hathaway objected to the terms of Canadian confederation and resigned from his government position when the terms were accepted by the government of Samuel Leonard Tilley. Hathaway's resignation helped defeat the government, and he was re-elected as an Anti-Confederate candidate later that year. He rejected Lieutenant Governor Arthur H. Gordon's invitation to form a new government. Hathaway instead became chief commissioner of public works in the government of Albert James Smith.

He did not run in the 1866 election won by the Confederation Party, but ran in 1870, three years after New Brunswick became a Canadian province. He was elected to the provincial legislature as a Conservative candidate. Party loyalties were weak during this period, however, and in February 1871, he helped depose the government of Conservative Premier George E. King, who was considered to be too close to the federal Conservative Party. Hathaway became the leader of a new Conservative government.

Hathaway's government passed the Common Schools Act which had been drawn up by his predecessor. The legislation implemented a single, tax supported public school system based on the principle of Separation of church and state that would have enacted direct taxation for education. He had run on this issue in the 1871 election and won.  The school act  called for "free, tax supported, non-sectarian schools" and was opposed both by opponents of direct taxation and by the Roman Catholic clergy who saw the bill as a threat to Catholic schools.

On June 25, 1872, Hathaway's hand was seriously injured when he jumped from a moving train. He died in Fredericton as a result of blood poisoning from this incident.

References
 
 Government of New Brunswick profile for Premier Hathaway

1813 births
1872 deaths
Canadian farmers
Businesspeople from New Brunswick
Businesspeople in timber
Premiers of New Brunswick
People from Sunbury County, New Brunswick